Ascrinvacumab (PF-03446962) is a monoclonal antibody designed for the treatment of cancer.

This drug was developed by Pfizer Inc.

References 

Monoclonal antibodies
Experimental cancer drugs